The comparison of the performances of all of the clubs that participated in UEFA Europa Conference League is below. The qualification rounds were not taken into account.

Clubs transferred from UEFA Europa League marked in italics.

Classification

Performance

See also
UEFA Europa Conference League
UEFA Europa League clubs performance comparison
UEFA Champions League clubs performance comparison

Notes

Association football comparisons